Local elections in Slovenia took place on 18 November 2018. Mayors of all 212 Slovenian municipalities and members of municipal councils were elected. A second round of mayoral elections took place on 2 December 2018.

Turnout 
Registered voters: 1,701,275

Mayoral elections 
Results of Mayoral elections:

2018
2018 in Slovenia